Nigel John Floyd Borell  (born 1973) is a New Zealand Māori artist, museum curator, and Māori art advocate. He curated the exhibition Toi Tū Toi Ora: Contemporary Māori Art at the Auckland Art Gallery Toi o Tāmaki in 2020, the largest exhibition since they opened. In 2021 the Art Foundation of New Zealand created an award (He Momo – A Moment in Time Award) to acknowledge the work of Borrell in this exhibition.

Biography 
Borell was born in 1973 and grew up in Ōtāhuhu and Manurewa in South Auckland. He is a twin and has two older siblings. Borell is Māori of Pirirākau, Ngāi Te Rangi, Ngāti Ranginui, and Te Whakatōhea descent.

His early influences included the Peter Gossage series of Māui illustrated books. He completed a Bachelor of Māori Visual Arts at Massey University in Palmerston North in 2000. There he studied under Robert Jahnke and the Toioho ki Apiti programme. He followed this by completing a Master of Fine Arts at Elam School of Fine Arts, University of Auckland in 2003. He has hands-on experience in Māori arts, working on three meeting house projects under tohunga whakaio Pakariki (Paki) Harrison 1995-2000 and kowhaiwhai artist Peter Boyd, and has been influenced by Māori curators Megan Tamati-Quennell and Ngahiraka Mason.

Borell was Associate Curator Māori Art at Auckland War Memorial Museum Tāmaki Paenga Hira from 2013 and Curator Māori Art at Auckland Art Gallery since 2015. At the gallery he worked for years on the largest exhibition since the gallery opened over 130 years ago called Toi Tū Toi Ora: Contemporary Māori Art. It featured work by 110 artists and brought in more visitors than any other exhibition since 1989. The documentary of the exhibition is by Chelsea Winstanley. Borell resigned from his role at the art gallery in January 2021 soon after Toi Tū Toi Ora opened stating the there was a lack of control awarded to him in the lead up and calling for 'colonial institutions to share power more equally'.

In 2022 it was announced he would return to Auckland War Memorial Museum as Curator Taonga Māori, the role previously held by Chanel Clarke. Borell is a trustee and curator of The Wairau Māori Art Gallery in the Hundertwasser Building in Whangarei, the first public Māori art gallery solely dedicated to profiling Māori artists and curators.

Art 

Borell’s work features on the ceiling of Ngā Kete Wānanga Marae, Manukau Institute of Technology, Ōtara.

Selected publications 
 Te Atinga: 25 years of Contemporary Māori Art. Wellington, New Zealand: Toi Maori Aotearoa, 2013.

Awards and honours 
 Appointed a Member of the New Zealand Order of Merit in the 2022 New Years Honours.
 2021 - Art Foundation’s inaugural He Momo – A Moment in Time Award for the Toi Tū Toi Ora exhibition.

Exhibitions 
 Pirirakau: Bush Beautiful, The Lane Gallery, Auckland 2006
 The Māori Portraits: Gottfried Lindauer’s New Zealand, Auckland Art Gallery Toi o Tāmaki/Young Fine Arts Museum, Auckland/San Francisco 2017
 Toi Tū Toi Ora: Contemporary Māori Art, Auckland Art Gallery Toi o Tāmaki, Auckland 2020

References 

1973 births
Elam Art School alumni
Living people
Massey University alumni
Members of the New Zealand Order of Merit
New Zealand art curators
20th-century New Zealand male artists
New Zealand Māori artists
Ngāi Te Rangi people
Ngāti Ranginui people
Whakatōhea people
Artists from Auckland
People from Manurewa
21st-century New Zealand male artists
New Zealand contemporary artists
21st-century New Zealand artists
20th-century New Zealand artists